Parkway North High School is a public high school in unincorporated St. Louis County, Missouri.

Demographics
The student body is about 51 percent White, 31 percent Black, and 9 percent Asian.

Building architecture
The school extensively used open classrooms, as the school was originally constructed without walls separating classrooms. This was a trend in architecture in 1971 when the building was constructed. However, the infeasibility of this design was discovered ten years later, and plaster walls were inserted between classrooms, resulting in an eclectic mix of architectural styling, as well as the logistical problems with these newly created rooms receiving proper HVAC ventilation.  The new science department contains traditional classrooms with walls, moving the school away from its original architecture. The school features a main upper gym on the 1st floor and a smaller gym in the basement. Most of the classrooms are located in the 2nd floor.

Activities
For the 2019–2020 school year, the school offered 27 activities approved by the Missouri State High School Activities Association (MSHSAA): baseball, boys and girls basketball, cheerleading, boys and girls cross country, dance team, football, boys and girls golf, girls lacrosse, music activities, scholar bowl, boys and girls soccer, softball, speech and debate, boys and girls swimming and diving, boys and girls tennis, boys and girls track and field, boys and girls volleyball, water polo, and wrestling.

Notable alumni 
 Brad Edelman (1978), former NFL player
 Ruth Harker (1981), soccer player for the U.S. women's national team
 Randy and Jason Sklar (1990), twin comedians
 Cary Guffey (1990), actor
 Tommie Pierson Jr. (1991), state representative
 Eric Greitens (1992), former governor of Missouri
 Anne Valente (2000), novelist, short story writer
 Metro Boomin, (2012), record producer
Sug Sutton, (2016) , American basketball player
 John Kelly (sportscaster), sports announcer for St. Louis Blues on Fox Sports Midwest
 Living Things, band
 Steve Savard, voice of the St. Louis Rams, former Dallas Cowboy lineman, former news anchor at KMOV in St. Louis. Lead Anchor at KOLR 10 in Springfield, MO
 Mary Koboldt (1982), 1988 Olympian, US Field Hockey. 1987 Pan American Field Hockey Team.

References

External links 
 Parkway Alumni Association

High schools in St. Louis County, Missouri
Educational institutions established in 1971
Public high schools in Missouri
1971 establishments in Missouri
Buildings and structures in St. Louis County, Missouri